The Guitar Show is currently the UK's largest guitar exhibition, held at Bingley Hall in Birmingham, England, on the last weekend of February each year and is in its second year.

Over the weekend, guitar brands from all over the world are featured including Fender, Gibson, Marshall, Orange, Blackstar, Laney, and Ibanez, who all show their latest releases for the coming year.

Each year, the show boasts a number of well-known artists, and the 2016 show featured Thin Lizzy and Black Star Riders guitarist Scott Gorham, who did a meet and greet on the Marshall Amplification stand.

Competitions
The 2016 show offered a number of prizes and competitions. Among these was a competition to "Beat the Devil" in a guitar duel on the Ernie Ball Musicman stage.

References

Exhibitions in the United Kingdom